Neoclassical dark wave is a subgenre of dark wave music that is characterized by an ethereal atmosphere and soprano vocals as well as strong influences from classical music.

Historical context
In the middle of the 1980s, the bands Dead Can Dance and In the Nursery released influential albums which essentially laid the foundations of the Neoclassical dark wave genre.
In 1985 Dead Can Dance released Spleen and Ideal, which initiated the band's 'medieval European sound.' 
In 1987 In the Nursery released Stormhorse, which exhibited a symphonic/post-industrial sound lending itself to 'being envisioned as backing music for a dramatic epic.'

See also 
 Dark ambient
 Martial industrial (martial music)
 Neofolk
 Dungeon synth

References 

Classical music
Dark wave

de:Dark Wave#Neoklassik